Nord 3.021 to 3.075 were 0-6-4 tank locomotives for mixed traffic of the Chemins de Fer du Nord.

Construction history

The locomotives were built from 1880 to 1883 by the Société Alsacienne de Constructions Mécaniques (SACM) in Belfort.
Many constructive details of the boiler and the mechanisms were of a similar design as the preceding the Nord 2.800 class Outrance express locomotives, also a double frame chassis was used.
The locomotives themselves also were the precursors of the Nord 3.401 to 3.512 locomotive series, with which they shared many constructive details.
The machines were retired from service from 1932 to 1935.

References

Bibliography

External links

 ETH-Bibliothek Zürich, Bildarchiv. Chemins de fer du Nord 3.023, viewer
 ETH-Bibliothek Zürich, Bildarchiv. Chemins de fer du Nord 3.023, viewer

Steam locomotives of France
3.021
0-6-4T locomotives
Railway locomotives introduced in 1880